Clinus is a genus of clinids found in the southeastern Atlantic and western Indian ocean.

Species
There are currently 19 recognized species in this genus on FishBase and 22 on WoRMS:
 Clinus acuminatus (Bloch & J. G. Schneider, 1801) (Sad klipfish)
 Clinus agilis J. L. B. Smith, 1931 (Agile klipfish)
 Clinus arborescens Gilchrist & W. W. Thompson, 1908
 Clinus berrisfordi M. L. Penrith, 1967 (Onrust klipfish)
 Clinus brevicristatus Gilchrist & W. W. Thompson, 1908 (Cape klipfish)
 Clinus cottoides Valenciennes, 1836 (Bluntnose klipfish)
 Clinus exasperatus Holleman, von der Heyden & Zsilavecz, 2012
 Clinus helenae (J. L. B. Smith, 1946) (Helen's klipfish)
 Clinus heterodon Valenciennes, 1836 (Westcoast klipfish)
 Clinus latipennis Valenciennes, 1836 (False Bay klipfish)
 Clinus musaicus Holleman, von der Heyden & Zsilavecz, 2012
 Clinus nematopterus Günther, 1861 (Chinese klipfish)
 Clinus robustus Gilchrist & W. W. Thompson, 1908 (Robust klipfish)
 Clinus rotundifrons Barnard, 1937 (Kelp klipfish)
 Clinus spatulatus B. A. Bennett, 1983 (Bot River klipfish)
 Clinus superciliosus (Linnaeus, 1758) (Highfin or Super klipfish)
 Clinus taurus Gilchrist & W. W. Thompson, 1908 (Bull klipfish)
 Clinus venustris Gilchrist & W. W. Thompson, 1908 (Speckled klipfish)
 Clinus woodi (J. L. B. Smith, 1946) (Oldman klipfish)

 Names brought to synonymy
 Clinus elegans Valenciennes, 1836 or Clinus geniguttatus Valenciennes, 1836, synonyms for Calliclinus geniguttatus

References 

 
Ray-finned fish genera
Clinidae
Taxa named by Georges Cuvier
Taxonomy articles created by Polbot